Paul Miner (born December 4, 1976) is the bassist for Death by Stereo, who left the band early 2005 (right before the band's fourth album Death for Life), to produce, engineer, master, and mix music full-time. Previously he produced and engineered the first three Death by Stereo records, which is probably why the band's fourth album Death for Life, was a noticeable departure from their regular sound.

Paul was also in a band called Kill The Messenger, which was also signed to Indecision Records.

Paul is the brother of Jim Miner, the original guitarist, who left the band during the recording of Death by Stereo's third album Into the Valley of Death.

Paul and his brother Jim recently reunited with Death by Stereo in 2006 to record their upcoming fifth studio album, entitled Death Is My Only Friend, which is due for release in 2009.

Miner began producing other bands in the 2000s; among his credits are recordings by Touché Amoré, This Moment, Avenue of Escape, Suburban Crisis, New Found Glory, H2O, Atreyu, Thrice, The Casualties, Underminded and Acid Rain.

External links
 Personal website -- includes a comprehensive list of his engineering and producing credits

Death by Stereo members
1976 births
Living people
American record producers
American punk rock bass guitarists
American male bass guitarists
21st-century American bass guitarists
21st-century American male musicians